Floodland may refer to:
 Floodland (novel), a 2000 fantasy novel by Marcus Sedgwick
 Floodland (album), a 1987 album by the Sisters of Mercy
 Floodland (video game), a 2022 game by Vile Monarch

See also
 Floodplain